The Equestrian monument of Emmanuel Philibert, commonly known as  ; traditionally spelled   rises in the center of Piazza San Carlo in central Turin, in the Piedmont region of Italy.

History
The monument was completed in 1838 in Paris by Carlo Marochetti, commissioned by King Charles Albert of Savoy to commemorate the military prowess of one of an ancestor from his dynasty, Emmanuel Philibert, Duke of Savoy. In the statue, the armored duke with a feathered helmet, astride a prancing horse, sheathes his sword, to signify his military feats. On the base, two bronze bas-reliefs depict the Battle of St. Quentin (1557) and the Treaty of Cateau-Cambrésis. An inscription celebrates the return of Emmanuel Philibert to Savoy.

References

Equestrian statues in Italy
Buildings and structures in Turin
Bronze sculptures in Italy
Outdoor sculptures in Italy
1838 sculptures
Statues in Italy
Statues of military officers
Sculptures of men in Italy